Kepler-445c is an exoplanet orbiting the red dwarf star Kepler-445 every 5 days in the inner edge of the star's circumstellar habitable zone. PHL does not consider this planet potentially habitable.

Physical features
With a radius of 2.72 times that of Earth, it is likely a mini-Neptune with a gaseous composition. Assuming that Kepler-445c instead has the same density as Earth, it would have a mass of 15.9 , according to the PHL exoplanet density calculator .

References

Exoplanets discovered by the Kepler space telescope
Exoplanets discovered in 2015
Transiting exoplanets
Super-Earths

Cygnus (constellation)